Lanfang may refer to:

 Lanfang Republic, a former state in West Kalimantan
Lanfanghui (蘭芳會), the religious organization that preceded the republic
 Lanfang, Guangdong (蓝坊镇), town in Jiaoling County, Guangdong, China
 Lanfang, Jiangxi (蓝坊镇), town in Gao'an, Jiangxi, China

See also
 Mei Lanfang
 Langfang (disambiguation)